The Historical Journal, formerly known as The Cambridge Historical Journal, is a peer-reviewed academic journal published by Cambridge University Press. It publishes approximately thirty-five articles per year on all aspects of British, European, and world history since the fifteenth century. In addition, each issue contains numerous review articles covering a wide range of historical literature. Contributing authors include historians of established academic reputation as well as younger scholars making their debut in the historical profession.

History
The journal was founded in 1923 as The Cambridge Historical Journal by Harold Temperley. It obtained its present title in 1958 when the journal editors decided to adopt a more global perspective. Despite choosing to omit the Cambridge label from the latter date, it remained under the editorial leadership of the History Faculty at the University of Cambridge, as it does to this day.

Its current editors are Dr. Rachel Leow (Faculty of History, Cambridge University) and Dr John Gallagher (University of Leeds).

Scope
The journal aims to publish around thirty-five articles and book reviews each year.

Abstracting
The Historical Journal is abstracted by Historical Abstracts, Periodicals Index Online, and ABELL.

See also
 Historiography
 Historiography of the United Kingdom

References

Further reading
 Clark, G. Kitson. "A Hundred Years of the Teaching of History at Cambridge, 1873–1973." Historical Journal 16#3 (1973): 535–53. online.

External links 
 

History journals
Publications established in 1923
English-language journals
Cambridge University Press academic journals
Quarterly journals